Radio Doboj or Радио Добој is a Bosnian local public radio station, broadcasting from Doboj, Bosnia and Herzegovina.

It was launched on 17 April 1967 by the municipal council of Doboj. In Yugoslavia and in SR Bosnia and Herzegovina, it was part of local/municipal Radio Sarajevo network affiliate. This radio station broadcasts a variety of programs such as music, sport, local news and talk shows. Program is mainly produced in Serbian.

Estimated number of potential listeners of Radio Doboj is around 166,261. Radiostation is also available in municipalities of Zenica-Doboj Canton and in Bosanska Posavina area.

RTV Doboj, a cable television channel, is also part of public municipality services.

Frequencies
 Doboj

See also 
List of radio stations in Bosnia and Herzegovina

References

External links 
 www.fmscan.org
 www.rtvdoboj.org
 Communications Regulatory Agency of Bosnia and Herzegovina

Doboj
Radio stations established in 1967